The 1982 Seiko Super Tennis – Singles was a tennis event of the 1982 Tokyo Indoor tournament. The draw for the event consisted of 32 players. Vincent Van Patten was the defending champion, but lost in the second round in 1982. First-seeded John McEnroe won the tournament, beating Peter McNamara in the final, 7–6(8–6), 7–5.

Seeds

Draw

Finals

Top half

Bottom half

References

External links
 Main draw

1982 Grand Prix (tennis)
Tokyo Indoor